Wolffs Revier is a German television series.

See also
List of German television series

References

External links

German crime television series
1990s German police procedural television series
2000s German police procedural television series
1992 German television series debuts
2006 German television series endings
Television shows set in Berlin
German-language television shows
Sat.1 original programming